Ronald Thompson (15 November 1917 – 16 May 2006) was an Australian trade unionist and politician who was a member of the Legislative Council of Western Australia from 1959 to 1980. He served as a minister in the government of John Tonkin.

Thompson was born in Fremantle to Margaret Alice (née Mewburn) and Samuel Thompson. He left school at the age of 14, and subsequently worked as a wool classer at the Fremantle Woolstores. He was later employed as a shopkeeper and waterside worker, and held various positions in the local branch of the Waterside Workers' Federation (WWF). Thompson entered parliament at a 1959 Legislative Council by-election for West Province, caused by the death of Gilbert Fraser. He transferred to the new South Metropolitan Province at the 1965 state election. After Labor's victory at the 1971 election, Thompson was appointed government whip and deputy leader of the government in the Legislative Council.

In February 1973, when Bill Willesee resigned due to ill health, Thompson was elevated to the ministry, becoming Minister for Community Welfare and Minister for Police. A few months later, he also replaced Don Taylor as Minister for Tourism, holding all three portfolios until the government's defeat at the 1974 election. He then became a member of the Tonkin Shadow Ministry. In 1977, Thompson was expelled from the Labor Party after publicly opposing its policy on homosexuality. He sat as an independent until his term ended at the 1980 state election, and died in Perth in May 2006, aged 88. He had married Doris Violet Brams in 1943, with whom he had two children.

References

|-

|-

1917 births
2006 deaths
Australian Labor Party members of the Parliament of Western Australia
Australian trade unionists
Australian waterside workers
Independent members of the Parliament of Western Australia
Members of the Western Australian Legislative Council
People from Fremantle